Duarte Cartaxo Tammilehto (born 15 February 1990) is a Finnish football player who currently plays for the Veikkausliiga side FC Honka in Finland.

He also holds a Portuguese passport.

Honours

Club

FC Honka
 Finnish Cup: 2012
 Finnish League Cup: 2011

References

External links
 Duarte Tammilehto at FC Honka 
 
 
 Profile at veikkausliiga.com 

1990 births
Living people
Finnish footballers
Portuguese footballers
FC Honka players
Veikkausliiga players
Portuguese emigrants to Finland
Finnish people of Portuguese descent
Sportspeople from Cascais
Klubi 04 players
Association football midfielders